Count Jan Dobrzenský z Dobrzenicz (born 14 June 1946 in Prague, Czech Republic) is a Czech-French count and, since 2010, the 50th Grand Master of the Orléans obedience of the Order of Saint Lazarus.

Biography

Jan Dobrzenský z Dobrzenicz was born on 14 June 1946 in Prague, Czechoslovakia, from an ancient comital Czech noble family. The family escaped from communist Czechoslovakia in 1948. Dobrzensky grew up in Canada, and later in France. Education: grade school, high school in Canada, Kepner, then higher education in Paris: Tregoe Business Management 1974, Paris, M.B.A. from CEDEP, Fontainebleau, in 1983, and Institut de Finance in 1988.

He is a citizen of France and the Czech Republic, living after return from exile in Chotěboř, Czech Republic. He is married with four children.

Dobrzenský was appointed a Knight Commander of the Order of St. Gregory the Great in 2016.

Order of Saint Lazarus

Since 1976, Dobrzenský has been a member of the Orléans obedience of the Order of Saint Lazarus (since 2004). In recent years, he held the office of Grand Prior of Bohemia, and President of the Order's governing council of the obedience he belongs to.

In March 2010, Prince Charles Philippe, Duke of Anjou decided to step down from his position as Grand Master of this obedience for personal reasons, while maintaining his participation in the Order's activities in the capacity of Grand Master Emeritus, Grand Prior of France, and chairman of the Order's governing council. He was replaced at that time by Dobrzenský as Grand Master.

Gallery

References

Bohemian nobility
Czech nobility
Grand Masters of the Order of Saint Lazarus (statuted 1910)
Living people
Knights Commander of the Order of St Gregory the Great
1946 births
INSEAD alumni